Guille may refer to:

Guille (name), a surname and given name
Guillé, a town in Burkina Faso

See also
Guile (disambiguation)